The Aeronautical Telecommunication Network (ATN) is an internetwork architecture that allows ground/ground, air/ground, and avionic data subnetworks to interoperate by adopting common interface services and protocols based on the ISO OSI Reference Model.

The European part of ATN used for ground/ground communications is represented by PENS.

See also 
 Aircraft Communications Addressing and Reporting System (ACARS)
 DO-219
 DO-232
 Future Air Navigation System (FANS)

References

Aircraft instruments
Avionics
Air traffic control